South Carolina Highway 210 (SC 210) is a  state highway in the U.S. state of South Carolina. The highway connects Branchville, Bowman, and Vance.

Route description
SC 210 begins at an intersection with U.S. Route 21 (US 21; Freedom Road) in Branchville, within Orangeburg County. It travels to the northeast and leaves the city limits. The highway immediately crosses Pen Branch. It continues to the northeast and crosses over Cattle Creek and Sandy Run before entering Bowman. There, it has a very brief concurrency with US 178 (Charleston Highway). The highway crosses over Cow Castle Creek before heading to the east. After an interchange with Interstate 26 (I-26), the highway curves back to the northeast. In Providence, SC 210 intersects US 176 (Old State Road). After crossing over Providence Swamp, the highway intersects US 15 (Bass Drive). It heads to the east again, crossing over I-95. It crosses over Horse Range Swamp and then enters Vance. In town, it crosses a railroad track and intersects SC 310 (Camden Road). In the eastern part of town, it meets its eastern terminus, an intersection with SC 6.

Major intersections

See also

References

External links

SC 210 South Carolina Hwy Index

210
Transportation in Orangeburg County, South Carolina